Emmanuel Carvallo was a French mathematician. He is notable for showing in 1897 that bicycles could be self-stable, for opposing wave models of X-rays in 1900, and for claiming in 1912 that Einstein's Theory of Relativity had been proven false.

References

French mathematicians